Doctor Porfirio Parra is a rural community located in Guadalupe Municipality, Chihuahua, Mexico. It had a population of 956 inhabitants at the 2010 census, and is situated at an elevation of 1,100 meters above sea level.

References

Populated places in Chihuahua (state)